PBS Kids Go! was an educational television brand used by PBS for programs aimed at early elementary-age children, in contrast to the younger, preschool target demographic of PBS Kids. Most PBS member stations aired the PBS Kids Go! block on weekdays during after-school hours, generally 3-6 pm depending on local station scheduling. In addition to the block, there was a PBS Kids Go! section on the PBS Kids website which featured games, videos, and other activities that were geared toward older kids. The brand was used on air and online for nearly nine years from 2004 to 2013.

History
Upon recognizing that educational programming for elementary-age children was lacking, PBS adjusted its mission to include a greater focus on this older subset of viewers. The PBS Kids Go! programming block was launched on October 11, 2004, alongside the premiere of brand new programs Maya & Miguel and Postcards from Buster. Also part of the block were existing PBS Kids series, Arthur and Cyberchase, both of which were already targeting a slightly older audience.

In 2005, PBS joined with Comcast and other production companies to form the cable channel PBS Kids Sprout, effectively replacing PBS' original PBS Kids Channel. This left many local PBS stations with a vacancy on their multicast digital channel offerings, during a time when digital and high-definition broadcasts were increasing reach and gaining popularity. In April 2006, PBS announced plans for a 24-hour digital multicast network called PBS Kids Go! Channel. This would expand upon the afternoon PBS Kids Go! block on PBS, with additional new content and reruns of returning programs, such as HIT Entertainment's Wishbone and Kratts’ Creatures. With only one-third of PBS stations initially committing to carry the new network, the plans for the channel were ultimately withdrawn. Stations found that the sliding scale licensing fees were too high for what little exclusive programming they would have received, especially after spending additional funds for the PBS HD feed. Despite the failure to launch a 24-hour channel, the PBS Kids Go! afternoon block continued to air on local PBS stations over the next several years and continued to expand its lineup with new series, such as Fetch! with Ruff Ruffman, WordGirl, The Electric Company, and Wild Kratts. Many stations also carried other series under the PBS Kids Go! brand, such as Design Squad and reruns of Wishbone, which typically aired over the weekend.

As online streaming began to increase in popularity, PBS developed the PBS Kids Go! video player on its website in 2008. This federally-funded, innovative video streaming platform featured video clips from a number of PBS Kids Go! shows which rotated on a weekly basis and linked to interactive online games. The video player would later evolve into the PBS Kids Video app, which is now the primary source for free streaming of on-demand video clips and full episodes of PBS Kids programming.

On May 15, 2013, PBS announced at their annual conference that the PBS Kids Go! brand would be discontinued in the fall, with all Go! programming rebranded with an updated, universal branding design across all of PBS's children's programming. PBS considered the nine year long effort to age up its overall audience to be successful, but studies showed that brand recognition was not strongly differentiated from that of PBS Kids, and many shows ended up being successful with broad audiences in both younger and older age groups. The new PBS Kids redesign was introduced on October 7, 2013 with the premiere of Peg + Cat, at which point PBS Kids Go! was officially discontinued. After the shutdown, all shows that premiered before the launch of the PBS Kids Go! block returned to the main PBS Kids block after nearly a decade, and all shows that premiered during the PBS Kids Go! block were permanently moved to the main PBS Kids block.

Programming
 1 Premiered before the launch of PBS Kids Go!
 2 Only aired as reruns

Former programming

Original programming

Shorts and web series
PBS Kids Go! aired shorts and other interstitial content related to its main programming, usually in between episodes or right before the end credits. Short-form programming included The Amazing Colossal Adventures of WordGirl (debuted on November 10, 2006, and later became a full series) and Oh Noah! (debuted as Noah Comprende on April 11, 2011), both of which were featured on air and online. As with many other PBS Kids shows, there were miscellaneous live-action interstitials featuring kids talking about things they do; about their families' heritage; or other topics specific to the associated program, typically used as a time-filler. In addition, there were web-exclusive short series on the PBS Kids Go! website, including Fizzy's Lunch Lab, Jim Henson's Wilson & Ditch: Digging America, and Chuck Vanderchuck's 'Something Something' Explosion. The PBS Kids Go! website was also home for new companion websites of then out-of-production series Kratts' Creatures and Zoom, and other educational websites, like "KidsWorld Sports" and "It's My Life".

Writing and illustrating contest

In 2009, PBS launched the first contest called PBS Kids Go! Writers Contest to continue the annual writing and illustrating competition for children in kindergarten through 3rd grade, which started in 1995 as the Reading Rainbow Young Writers and Illustrators Contest. In 2014, it was renamed to PBS Kids Writers Contest.

References

Television programming blocks in the United States
PBS original programming
PBS Kids
PBS Kids shows